Robert Sidney Cahn (9 June 1899 – 15 June 1981) was a British chemist, best known for his contributions to chemical nomenclature and stereochemistry, particularly by the Cahn–Ingold–Prelog priority rules, which he proposed in 1956 with Christopher Kelk Ingold and Vladimir Prelog.

Cahn was born in Hampstead, London. He became a fellow of the Royal Institute of Chemistry and was editor of the Journal of the Chemical Society from 1949 until 1963, and he remained with the Society as Director of Publications Research until his retirement in 1965.

References

Bibliography
  and subsequent editions published in 1964, 1968, and 1974.

British chemists
1899 births
1981 deaths
Stereochemists
Fellows of the Royal Society of Chemistry